Wagafi bread (in Arabic often referred to as white bread) is an Iranian type of bread that normally contains a greater amount of flour than normal bread.  It is a flat, thin bread. The bread is made in a hole called a tannour.

See also

 List of breads

References

Breads

Flatbreads
Iranian breads